Ben Ward (born 10 December 1988 from Dorchester) is a former English professional darts player who plays in Professional Darts Corporation tournaments.

Darts career
Ward competed on the PDC Challenge Tour in 2013 and won two events to finish second in the Order of Merit behind Ross Smith.
Ward was awarded a place in the preliminary round of the 2014 PDC World Championship, which was reserved for the Challenge Tour winner, as Smith had already qualified for the first round via the Pro Tour Order of Merit. Ward played against Austria's Zoran Lerchbacher in the preliminary round and lost 4–1.

In March, Ward qualified for his first UK Open but was beaten 5–0 by Steve Maish in the second round. He reached the quarter-final stages of a PDC ProTour event for the first time at the seventh Players Championship of the year, where he lost 6–1 against Keegan Brown, who averaged 112.32 during the match. He made his European Tour debut at the Austrian Darts Open and beat Barrie Bates 6–4, before losing 6–5 to Brendan Dolan in the second round.

Ward beat Jason Lovett 5–2 in the preliminary round of the 2015 UK Open, but lost 5–1 to Mark Cox in the first round. He couldn't get past the last 64 of any event during the year and added just £500 to his Order of Merit ranking, meaning his ranking plunged to number 102. He tried to win his place back on tour via 2016 Q School, but failed to advance beyond the last 128 on any of the four days. He did not qualify for the 2016 UK Open and played in all 16 of the Challenge Tour events, reaching the last 32 once.

World Championship results

PDC
 2014: Preliminary round (lost to Zoran Lerchbacher 1–4) (legs)

References

External links

Living people
1988 births
English darts players
Sportspeople from Dorchester, Dorset
Professional Darts Corporation former tour card holders